A lame is a solid piece of sheet metal used as a component of a larger section of plate armor used in Europe during the medieval period. It is used in armors to provide articulations or the joining of the armor elements. The size is usually small with a narrow and rectangular shape. Multiple lames are riveted together or connected by leather straps or cloth lacing to form an articulated piece of armor that provides flexible protection. The armor worn by the samurai class of feudal Japan used lames in the construction of many of their individual armor parts. The Japanese term is ita, which can both refer to the lame or its borderings.

Examples 
The Dos Aguas armor produced in Valencia, Spain, is an example of a plate armor made of lames. The tassets are composed of three lames, with the inner edge of each turned out at right angles. The design provided the armor strength due to the continuous arch-shaped flange. The Schott-Sonnenberg style produced in Nuremberg also featured a three-lame skirt. The tassets are also composed of lames riveted to the lower lame of the fauld.

See also
Lamellar armour
Laminar armour
Scale armour

References

External links
 Plate armour

Western plate armour
Samurai armour